Belarus–Georgia relations are foreign relations between Belarus and Georgia.  Before 1918, both countries were part of the Russian Empire and both were part of the USSR until 1991.  Both countries established diplomatic relations in 1992.

Belarus has an embassy in Tbilisi. Georgia has an embassy in Minsk.

Ethnic Georgians in Belarus number exactly 2,400 as of the country's 2009 census, and live mainly in the capital Minsk. They mainly came during the Soviet era as labor migrants, or were displaced during Soviet relocation. They are keeping their cultural heritage, speak Georgian language and belong to Georgian Orthodox Church.

History 
In 2006, there was a deterioration in relations between states. The leadership of the Republic of Belarus accused a group of Georgian deputies of trying to organize a color revolution in order to overthrow Alexander Lukashenko. The President of Belarus Alexander Lukashenko stated in 2007 when meeting with Interior Minister of Georgia Ivane Merabishvili that "Belarus is determined to restore and boost relations with Georgia".

Recent tensions 
On 28 September 2022 President of Belarus, Alexander Lukashenko  visited Georgian breakaway territory Abkhazia and there he had meetings with de facto leader Aslan Bzhania and other senior officials. "I strongly condemn Aleksandr Lukashenka’s visit to occupied Abkhazia," President Salome Zourabichvili wrote on Twitter. "This is an unacceptable violation of Georgia’s Law on Occupied Territories and of the principles of our bilateral relations and international law." The Ministry called on Belarus to respect the sovereignty and territorial integrity of Georgia and "not to take actions which contradict the fundamental principles of international law." In February 2023, Bzhania visited Minsk for a visit of his own, after which the Georgian Foreign Ministry described it as "an attempt to legitimize the Russian occupation regime." Lukashenko criticized Tbilisi's stance, saying to Bzhania “maybe these relations will be able to promote peace and friendship between Abkhazian and Georgian peoples.”

High level visits
In 2010, the Deputy Prime Minister of Belarus, Andrei Kobyakov, visited Georgian President Mikheil Saakashvili in Batumi. The first official visit of the head of Belarus to Georgia took place in April 2015, where he visited the cities of Tbilisi and Batumi. In March 2016, the Prime Minister of Georgia Giorgii Kvirikashvili paid a visit to the Republic of Belarus .

Envoys

From Georgia to Belarus 

 Davit Zalkalian (2008-2009)
 Giorgi Chkheidze (2010-2012)
 Davit Kotaria (2012-present)

From Belarus to Georgia

Diplomacy

Republic of Belarus
Tbilisi (Embassy)

Republic of Georgia
Minsk (Embassy)

See also  
 Foreign relations of Belarus 
 Foreign relations of Georgia
 Georgians in Belarus

References

External links 
  Georgian Ministry of Foreign Affairs about relations with Belarus
Belarus and Georgia: Russian lessons and Lukashenka’s new strategy Belarus Digest

Georgia
Bilateral relations of Georgia (country)